Nurlan Abilmazhinuly (born December 1962), also spelled Nurlan Äbilmäjinulı or Nurlan Abelmanjen, is a Chinese politician of Kazakh origin, currently serving as chairman of the Xinjiang Regional Committee of the Chinese People's Political Consultative Conference.

He was an alternate member of the 18th Central Committee of the Chinese Communist Party and is a member of the 19th Central Committee of the Chinese Communist Party. He was a representative of the 16th and 18th National Congress of the Chinese Communist Party, and is a representative of the 19th National Congress of the Chinese Communist Party. He was a member of the 12th National Committee of the Chinese People's Political Consultative Conference and is a member of the 13th National Committee of the Chinese People's Political Consultative Conference.

Early life and education
Nurlan Abilmazhinuly was born in Huocheng County, Xinjiang, in December 1962. In 1981, he entered Xinjiang University, majoring in law.

Career
He joined the Chinese Communist Party in May 1985. After graduating in July 1985, he became a judge in Gongliu County People's court. He was eventually promoted to president in March 1987. In January 1992, he became vice president of Ili Prefecture Branch of Higher People's Court of Xinjiang Uygur Autonomous Region, rising to president the next year. He served as vice governor of Ili Kazakh Autonomous Prefecture in July 2001, and one year later promoted to the governor position. He was promoted to be vice chairman of Xinjiang in January 2003, concurrently served as deputy secretary of Political and Legal Committee of the Party Committee of Xinjiang Uygur Autonomous Region. In October 2006, he was promoted to member of the standing committee of the Xinjiang Regional Party Committee, the region's top authority. In January 2013, he was appointed chairman of the Xinjiang Regional Committee of the Chinese People's Political Consultative Conference, succeeding Ashat Kerimbay.

References

1962 births
Living people
People from Huocheng County
Xinjiang University alumni
Beijing Normal University alumni
Kazakhs in China
Ili Kazakh Autonomous Prefecture governors
People's Republic of China politicians from Xinjiang
Chinese Communist Party politicians from Xinjiang
Alternate members of the 18th Central Committee of the Chinese Communist Party
Members of the 20th Central Committee of the Chinese Communist Party
Members of the 19th Central Committee of the Chinese Communist Party
Members of the 12th Chinese People's Political Consultative Conference
Members of the 13th Chinese People's Political Consultative Conference